Kutu is an island and municipality in the state of Chuuk, Federated States of Micronesia.

References

Municipalities of Chuuk State
Islands of Chuuk State